Aglona (hist. ) is a village in Preiļi Municipality, Latvia.

Located on the narrow strip of land between the lakes Cirišs and Egles, the present-day village is the result of merger of three settlements: Aglona, Somerseta and Jaunciems. The scenic beauty of the surrounding area attracts many visitors every summer. The nearby Sacrifice Island, Devil's Lake, and the Madelanu Castle Mound are among the most beautiful places in Latvia. The surrounding pine forests have suffered from excessive logging in recent years, significantly damaging their once pristine quality. Traditionally, many families from Russia spend their summers in countryside near Aglona.

History
Aglona is famous in Latvia and beyond for its Basilica of the Assumption — the most important Catholic church in the country.  The church and monastery were founded by the Dominican fathers in 1700.  The original wooden church and monastery were razed in the 1760s and construction for a new church was begun in 1768 and completed by 1800 when it was consecrated.  It attracts tens of thousands of pilgrims every year on the day of the Assumption of Mary (15 August) as well as on Pentecost. The historic icon of the Aglona Mother of God is considered miraculous and has long been an object of veneration.  Its dates to the 17th century and its authorship is unknown.

In 1980 the Church celebrated its 200th anniversary and was officially given the status of a minor basilica by Pope John Paul II. In 1986 it was the site of celebration of the 800th anniversary of Christianity in Latvia. A major renovation of the basilica and expansion of the church grounds was begun in 1992 in preparation for the pope's visit. The shrine was visited by Pope John Paul II in September 1993 and over 300,000 pilgrims assembled at that time. Pope Francis visited in September 2018.

See also 
List of cities in Latvia
Basilica of the Assumption, Aglona

References

External links 

Aglona in detail at Latgale Research Center
Cathedral of Aglona
Aglyunas Zvaneņš (catholic weekly in Latgalian)
visitAglona Tourism website about Aglona and Latgale (a little bit)

Preiļi Municipality
Towns and villages in Latvia
Catholic pilgrimage sites
Latgale